The Blackfoot River, sometimes called the Big Blackfoot River to distinguish it from the Little Blackfoot River, is a snow-fed and spring-fed river in western Montana. The Blackfoot River begins in Lewis and Clark County at the Continental Divide, 10 miles (16 km) northeast of the town of Lincoln (4536 feet, 1382 m).  The river's headwaters are between Rogers Pass (5610 ft, 1710 m) to the north and Stemple Pass (6376 ft, 1943 m) to the south. It flows westward through the town of Milltown and enters the Clark Fork River approximately five miles (8 km) east of the city of Missoula (3210 ft, 978 m).

The Blackfoot River is renowned for its recreational opportunities, most notably fly fishing, but also rafting, canoeing, and inner tubing.  The Blackfoot is a fast, cold river with many deep spots, making it prime habitat for several varieties of trout.

The river's canyon and the valleys were formed by the Missoula Floods, cataclysmic glacial lake outburst floods which occurred at the end of the last ice age.

The Blackfoot River and the Clark Fork experienced a record flood in 1908.

The river is featured in the 1976 novella A River Runs Through It by Norman Maclean, as well as the 1992 film starring Brad Pitt, directed by Robert Redford.

The Blackfoot is a Class I river from the Cedar Meadow fishing access site west of Helmville to its confluence with the Clark Fork River for public access for recreational purposes.

See also

Montana Stream Access Law
List of rivers of Montana

Further reading

References

External links
USGS water flows and Statistical Data
Mystery of the Megaflood at PBS.org

Rivers of Montana
Bodies of water of Missoula County, Montana
Rivers of Lewis and Clark County, Montana
Bodies of water of Powell County, Montana